The Evergreen A class (or Ever A) is a series of 13 container ships being built for Evergreen Marine. The largest ships have a maximal theoretical capacity of around 23,992 TEU and are among the largest container ships in the world. Six ships are being built by Samsung Heavy Industries in South Korea. Another seven will be built by China State Shipbuilding Corporation (CSSC) at two shipyards in China.

As of August 2021, the record for most containers loaded onto a single ship is held by the Ever Ace, which carried a total of 21,710 TEU of containers from Yantian to Europe.

List of ships

See also 

 Ever G-class
 Ever E-class
 Ever S-class
 Ever L-class
 Ever B-class
 Ever F-class
 HMM Algeciras-class
 Triton-class container ship
 Thalassa Hellas-class container ship

References 

Container ship classes
Ships built by Samsung Heavy Industries